Ochi is a narrative technique characteristic of rakugo and kobanashi.

Ochi may also refer to:

 Ochi (surname), a Japanese surname
 Ochi, Kōchi, a Japanese town
 Ochi (mountain), a Greek mountain
 Ochi of Bestoon, a character first mentioned in the film Star Wars: The Rise of Skywalker

See also
 Ohi Day, a Greek holiday also spelled Ochi Day
 Ochi District (disambiguation), two districts in Japan